Suspension of disbelief, sometimes called willing suspension of disbelief, is the avoidance of critical thinking or logic in examining something unreal or impossible in reality, such as a work of speculative fiction, in order to believe it for the sake of enjoyment. Aristotle first explored the idea of the concept in its relation to the principles of theater; the audience ignores the unreality of fiction in order to experience catharsis.

Origin 
The poet and aesthetic philosopher Samuel Taylor Coleridge introduced the English-language term "suspension of disbelief" in 1817 and suggested that if a writer could infuse a "human interest and a semblance of truth" into a fantastic tale, the reader would suspend judgement concerning the implausibility of the narrative. Coleridge sought to revive the use of fantastic elements in poetry and developed a concept to support how a modern, enlightened audience might continue to enjoy such types of literature.  The term resulted from a philosophical experiment, which Coleridge conducted with William Wordsworth within the context of the creation and reading of poetry. It involved an attempt to explain the supernatural persons or characters so that these creatures of imagination constitute some semblance of truth. In his Biographia Literaria, published in 1817, Chapter XIV describes this collaboration called Lyrical Ballads (first edition 1798), for which Coleridge had contributed the more romantic, Gothic pieces including The Rime of the Ancient Mariner. Here, Coleridge also referred to his concept as "poetic faith", citing the concept as a feeling analogous to the supernatural, which awakens the mind.

Coleridge recalled:

The notion of such an action by an audience was, however, recognized in antiquity, as seen particularly in the Roman theoretical concerns of Horace, who also lived in an age of increasing skepticism about the supernatural, in his Ars Poetica (with the quotation Ut pictura poesis). According to David Chandler, Coleridge drew his notion from Johann Jakob Brucker's Historia Critica Philosophiae, which cited the phrase "assensus suspensione" ("suspension of assent"). Brucker's phrase was itself a modernization of the phrase "adsensionis retentio" ("a holding back of assent") used by Marcus Tullius Cicero in his Academica.

Concept 
The traditional concept of the suspension of disbelief as proposed by Coleridge is not about suspending disbelief in the reality of fictional characters or events but the suspension of disbelief in the supernatural. This can be demonstrated in the way the reader suspends his disbelief in ghosts rather than the non-fictionality of the ghosts in a story. According to Coleridge's theory, suspension of disbelief is an essential ingredient for any kind of storytelling.

The phrase "suspension of disbelief" came to be used more loosely in the later 20th century, often used to imply that the burden was on the reader, rather than the writer, to achieve it. This might be used to refer to the willingness of the audience to overlook the limitations of a medium, so that these do not interfere with the acceptance of those premises. These premises may also lend to the engagement of the mind and perhaps proposition of thoughts, ideas, art and theories. With a film, for instance, the viewer has to ignore the reality that they are viewing a staged performance and temporarily accept it as their reality in order to be entertained.  Early black-and-white films are an example of visual media that require the audience to suspend their disbelief for this reason.

Suspension of disbelief often applies to fictional works of the action, comedy, fantasy, and horror genres in written literature and visual arts. Cognitive estrangement in fiction involves using a person's ignorance to promote suspension of disbelief.

Examples in literature 

Suspension of disbelief is sometimes said to be an essential component of live theater, where it was recognized by Shakespeare, who refers to it in the Prologue to Henry V: "make imaginary puissance [...] 'tis your thoughts that now must deck our kings [...] turning the accomplishment of many years into an hourglass". Poetry and fiction involving the supernatural had gone out of fashion to a large extent in the 18th century, in part due to the declining belief in witches and other supernatural agents among the educated classes, who embraced the rational approach to the world offered by the new science. Alexander Pope, notably, felt the need to explain and justify his use of elemental spirits in The Rape of the Lock, one of the few English poems of the century that invoked the supernatural.

Psychology 
Psychological critic Norman Holland points to a neuroscientific explanation.  When we hear or watch any narrative, our brains go wholly into perceiving mode, turning off the systems for acting or planning to act, and with them go our systems for assessing reality. We have, in Coleridge's second, more accurate phrase, "poetic faith" and so humans have such trouble recognizing lies: they first believe, then have to make a conscious effort to disbelieve.

Only when we stop perceiving to think about what we have seen or heard, only then do we assess its truth-value. If we are really "into" the fiction – "transported", in the psychologists' term – we are, as Immanuel Kant pointed out long ago, "disinterested". We respond aesthetically, without purpose.  We do not judge the truth of what we perceive even though if we stop being transported and think about it, we know quite well that it is a fiction.

Suspension of disbelief has also been used within a mental health context by Frank DeFulgentis in his book Flux. It is an attempt to describe the phenomenon of forgetting irrational thoughts associated with cases of OCD. In the book, the author suggests 'suspending disbelief' as opposed to forcing ourselves to forget; similar to how one would put a virus in quarantine. We can thereby allow ourselves to be absorbed in the activities around us until these irrationalities vanish of their own accord.

Criticisms 

Aesthetic philosophers generally reject claims that "suspension of disbelief" accurately characterizes the relationship between people and "fictions". Kendall Walton notes that if viewers were to truly suspend disbelief at a horror movie and accept its images as absolute fact, they would have a true-to-life set of reactions. For instance, audience members would cry out, "Look behind you!" to an endangered on-screen character, or they might call the police when they witness an on-screen murder.

Not all authors believe that "suspension of disbelief" adequately characterizes the audience's relationship to imaginative works of art. J. R. R. Tolkien challenges this concept in his essay "On Fairy-Stories", choosing instead the paradigm of secondary belief based on inner consistency of reality. Tolkien says that, in order for the narrative to work, the reader must believe that what they read is true within the secondary reality of the fictional world. By focusing on creating an internally consistent fictional world, the author makes secondary belief possible. Tolkien argues that suspension of disbelief is only necessary when the work has failed to create secondary belief, saying that from that point on, the spell is broken, and the reader ceases to be immersed in the story, and so must make a conscious effort to suspend their disbelief or else give up on it entirely.

See also

References

External links 
 Coleridge's Biographia Literaria, Chapter XIV, containing the term

Fiction
Plot (narrative)
Narratology
1817 introductions
1810s neologisms